Dylan Charles Covey (born August 14, 1991) is an American professional baseball pitcher in the Los Angeles Dodgers organization. He has previously played in Major League Baseball (MLB) for the Chicago White Sox and Boston Red Sox, and in the Chinese Professional Baseball League (CPBL) for the Rakuten Monkeys.

Covey was selected by the Milwaukee Brewers in the first round of the 2010 MLB draft. However, a physical examination performed by the Brewers diagnosed Covey with Type I diabetes. He, instead, chose to enroll at the University of San Diego, near his Pasadena, California, home, and played college baseball for the San Diego Toreros prior to being selected by the Oakland Athletics.

Career

Amateur career
Covey attended Maranatha High School in Pasadena, California, where he played for the school's baseball team. He pitched to a 1.30 earned run average (ERA) and a .131 batting average against in his four years at Maranatha. As a senior, Covey had a 7–1 win–loss record, a 0.40 ERA, and 138 strikeouts in  innings pitched. However, he lost  that year, and could not regain the weight.

The Milwaukee Brewers selected Covey in the first round, with the fourteenth overall selection, of the 2010 Major League Baseball draft. He indicated to the Brewers that he was likely to sign with them, but that he wanted a $2 million signing bonus. During his post-draft physical, Covey was diagnosed with Type I diabetes. He decided not to sign with the Brewers, as he needed time to adjust to having this condition. Covey's party was quoted as saying, "They [Milwaukee] knew they would have to do some special things for Dylan." He ended up turning down a $1.6 million signing bonus offer from Milwaukee.

Covey enrolled at the University of San Diego (USD), and he played college baseball for the San Diego Toreros baseball team. At USD, Covey was near his parents and doctors whom he trusted to help him manage his condition. As Covey regained weight, he struggled as a freshman, pitching to a 1–3 record, a 7.60 ERA, and almost as many walks (28) as strikeouts (29). He improved in his sophomore year, with a 6–3 record and 3.32 ERA, but with 43 walks and 50 strikeouts across 81 innings. In 2012, he played collegiate summer baseball with the Orleans Firebirds of the Cape Cod Baseball League. As a junior, Covey had a 5–4 record, and a 5.05 ERA.

Oakland Athletics
The Oakland Athletics selected Covey in the fourth round, with the 131st overall selection, of the 2013 MLB draft. He signed with the Athletics, receiving a $370,000 signing bonus. The Athletics assigned Covey to the Vermont Lake Monsters of the Class A-Short Season New York–Penn League, and after giving up no earned runs in 12 innings, promoted him to the Beloit Snappers of the Class A Midwest League where he finished the season, going 1–1 with a 4.75 ERA in 10 starts.

In 2014, Covey began the year with Beloit, before he was promoted to the Stockton Ports of the Class A-Advanced California League. In 26 games (25 starts) between the two teams, he was 7–14 with a 5.46 ERA. He pitched for Stockton in 2015, compiling an 8–9 record with a 3.59 ERA in 26 games started. Covey began the 2016 season with the Midland RockHounds of the Class AA Texas League, but suffered an oblique muscle strain in May and missed the remainder of the regular season. In six starts prior to his injury, he was 2–1 with a 1.84 ERA. The Athletics assigned Covey to the Mesa Solar Sox of the Arizona Fall League.

Chicago White Sox

On December 8, 2016, the Chicago White Sox selected Covey in the Rule 5 draft. Covey made the White Sox' Opening Day roster in 2017, and he made his major league debut on April 14. Aside from five rehab starts with the AZL White Sox and the Charlotte Knights, Covey spent half of 2017 with the White Sox, pitching to a 0–7 record and a 7.71 ERA in 18 games (12 starts).

Covey was outrighted to the minors and removed from the 40-man roster on February 18, 2018. He began the season with Charlotte. His contract was purchased on April 28 to start the second game of a doubleheader.
 He was optioned back to Charlotte the next day and recalled once again on May 19. Covey finished the 2018 season with a 5–14 record and 5.18 ERA in 27 MLB appearances (21 starts).

In 2019, Covey split time between Chicago and Triple-A Charlotte. He had a particularly difficult outing on July 28, allowing five runs without retiring a batter. In his 18 MLB outings (12 starts), he compiled a 1–8 record with a 7.98 ERA. Covey was designated for assignment by the White Sox on January 14, 2020, and outrighted on January 21. On January 22, Covey rejected an assignment to Triple-A Charlotte and became a free agent.

Tampa Bay Rays
On January 30, 2020, Covey signed a minor league deal with the Tampa Bay Rays.

Boston Red Sox
On July 21, 2020, Covey was traded to the Boston Red Sox. He made his first appearance for the Red Sox on July 25, allowing two runs in two innings of relief against the Baltimore Orioles. He was optioned to Boston's alternate training site on July 26, recalled for a week during August, and recalled again on September 10. Overall with the 2020 Red Sox, Covey appeared in 8 games (all in relief), compiling an 0–0 record with 7.07 ERA and 11 strikeouts in 14 innings pitched. On October 28, Covey was outrighted off of the 40-man roster and assigned to Triple-A.

Rakuten Monkeys
On May 18, 2021, Covey signed with the Rakuten Monkeys of the Chinese Professional Baseball League. He started 10 games for the team down the stretch, logging a 3–4 record and 4.01 ERA with 38 strikeouts in 58.1 innings pitched.

On December 28, 2021, he re-signed with the team, agreeing to a contract for the 2022 season. In 2022, Covey started 23 games for the Monkeys, recording a 13–6 record and 3.47 ERA with 100 strikeouts in 140.0 innings pitched.

Los Angeles Dodgers
On January 27, 2023, Covey signed a minor league contract with the Los Angeles Dodgers organization.

Personal life
Covey was home schooled until high school. He has two older brothers. Covey's father, Darrell, was selected by the New York Mets in the 29th round of the 1968 MLB draft out of Pasadena Junior College, but he did not sign or play professional baseball.

See also
Rule 5 draft results

References

External links

1991 births
Living people
People from Pasadena, California
Baseball players from California
Major League Baseball pitchers
Chicago White Sox players
Boston Red Sox players
San Diego Toreros baseball players
Orleans Firebirds players
Vermont Lake Monsters players
Beloit Snappers players
Stockton Ports players
Midland RockHounds players
Mesa Solar Sox players
Glendale Desert Dogs players
Charlotte Knights players
Arizona League White Sox players